Isabelle Florennes (born 2 August 1967) is a French politician of Democratic Movement  (Mouvement démocrate, MoDem) who was a member of the French National Assembly from 2017 to 2022, representing the Hauts-de-Seine's 4th constituency.

Political career
In the National Assembly, Florennes was member of the Committee on Legal Affairs and was part of the French-Belgian Parliamentary Friendship Group and the French-Senegalese Parliamentary Friendship Group. From 2020, she was a co-chair of the Inter-Parliamentary Alliance on China.

See also
 2017 French legislative election

References

1967 births
Living people
Deputies of the 15th National Assembly of the French Fifth Republic
La République En Marche! politicians
21st-century French women politicians
People from Arras
Politicians from Hauts-de-France
Women members of the National Assembly (France)
Democratic Movement (France) politicians
Paris 2 Panthéon-Assas University alumni
Members of Parliament for Hauts-de-Seine